Athletics at the 1999 Games of the Small States of Europe were held in Schaan, Liechtenstein between 24 and 29 May.

Medal summary

Men

Women

Medal table

References

Games of the Small States of Europe
1999
1999 Games of the Small States of Europe